The term ball cactus is usually applied to the species of:
Parodia (syn. Notocactus), a South American cactus genus often kept as houseplants

It has also been applied to any ball-shaped cactus, notably plants from all of the following genera:

And more specifically to:

Escobaria missouriensis, the Missouri foxtail cactus or common ball cactus
Escobaria vivipara, the spinystar or purple ball cactus
Gymnocalycium mihanovichii, the ruby ball or "moon" cactus
Parodia leninghausii, the golden ball cactus or lemon ball cactus
Parodia magnifica, the ball cactus or balloon cactus
Parodia scopa, the silver ball cactus
Pediocactus simpsonii, the mountain ball cactus